Sympistis poliafascies is a species of moth in the family Noctuidae (the owlet moths).

The MONA or Hodges number for Sympistis poliafascies is 10152.

References

Further reading

 
 
 

poliafascies
Articles created by Qbugbot
Moths described in 1910